Nangarhar University is a government-funded higher learning institution in Jalalabad, Afghanistan. It is the second largest university in Afghanistan. It has 13 colleges and 15,385 students.

Nangarhar University was established in 1963 as a medical college. It was later merged with other local colleges to become a full-fledged university. It now houses faculties in agriculture, engineering, literature, economic, medicine, theology, pedagogy, public administration and policy, political science and veterinary medicine.

Faculties 
Nangarhar University consists of faculties that include engineering, political science, economics, Public Administration and Policy, teachers' training, veterinary, computer science, Medical Faculty (NMF), Islamic Studies (Sharya), Agriculture, Journalism, Science, and Languages and Literature.

Students can take part in an e-learning program organized by Afghans Next Generation e-Learning.

Faculty of Languages and Literature

The faculty was established in 1984 under the administration of Nangarhar University. In that time, only the Pashto Department was available, with six lecturers, nominated by the Faculty of Pashto Language and Literature. Later on, the Russian Department was established, but after a short period, due to the lack of students in the department, it was closed.

 The Arabic Department was established in 1993. From 1992 there were changes in the curriculum of the Pashto Department such as the addition of English and Islamic subjects instead of Russian Language, Academic sociology and Political economics in addition to Pashto and English Departments. 
 The Dari Department was established in 2003. 
 The Hindi Department was established in 2006. 
 The German Department was established in 2014. 
 The Master program in Pashto Language was launched in 2014.
 
When other departments such as Arabic, English, Dari and Hindi department were added to the faculty the faculty name was changed from Faculty of Pashto and Literature to the Faculty of Languages and Literature. In 2015 the faculty had 1494 students studying in all six departments, 1403 are male and 91 are female students. There are 54 permanent professional lecturers.

Faculty aims  
 To provide  professionals in national and foreign languages (Pashto, Dari, English, Arabic, Hindi, Germany) to bring better communication to Afghanistan.
 To introduce Afghan cultural values into language learning.
 To provide academic seminars and conferences.
 To provide the facility of a master's degree in every department.
 To publish a historical and literary magazine.

Notable alumni
 Mohammad Amin Fatemi - graduated 1977
 Dr. Mohammad Hussain Yar - graduated 1973 - (1942-2012) - medical doctor and professor of anatomy - Nangarhar Medical Faculty
 Dr. Ahmad Siar Ahmadi - medical doctor, professor of pediatrics - Nangarhar Medical Faculty
 Dr. Mohammad Tahir Khan - Health and Well-being Coordinator - Toronto - Canada
 Dagarwal Dr. Muhammed Kabir Sadiqi - medical doctor, Chief of Medicine at Kandahar Air Field hospital from 1982 to 1985, Bagram Airfield Hospital from 1985 to 1990, and Kabul International Airport Hospital from 1990 to August 12, 1992. Died during the civil war on August 12, 1992.
 Fahim Rahimi - graduated 2011 - Professor of English, Faculty of Languages and Literature, Fulbright FLTA 2013-14 Fayetteville State University, North Carolina, USA.
 Humayoon Gardiwal - graduated 2003 - Master of Sciences in Public Health, University of Indonesia, Leadership Development for Health  Consultant, Ministry of Public Health.
 Khalid Sulayman - graduated 2009 - Masters in Arabic
 Mohammad Naeem Wardak -spokesperson of Taliban, Qatar Office. Obtained B.A. degree.

See also 
 List of universities in Afghanistan

References

 
Universities in Afghanistan
Medical schools in Afghanistan
 Educational institutions established in 1962
 Schools in Nangarhar Province
Jalalabad
 Public universities in Afghanistan